Tara Mira is a 2019 Indian Punjabi-language romantic drama film written and directed by Rajiev Dhingra and produced by Guru Randhawa, Ashok Yadav, Rajiev Dhingra, Jyoti Sekhon and Shilpa Sharma, under  banners 751 Films, Rapa Nui's Films, Yadu Production and Red Eyes Productions. It stars Ranjit Bawa and Nazia Hussain in lead roles. It was released on 11 October 2019.

Cast
 Ranjit Bawa
 Nazia Hussain 
 Gurpreet Ghuggi
 Sudesh Lehri  
 Yograj Singh
 Jhumma Mitra
 Rajeev Thakur 
 Anita Devgan
 Shawindra Mahal
 Ashok Pathak
 Mahavir Bhullar
 Guru Randhawa (cameo appearance)

Production
The film was announced on 30 June 2019, with Ranjit Bawa and Nazia Hussain in lead roles. The film to be directed by Rajiev Dhingra and bankrolled by Guru Randhawa, Ashok Yadav, Rajiev Dhingra, Jyoti Sekhon and Shilpa Sharma.

Release 
It was released on 11 October 2019.

Soundtrack 

The soundtrack is composed by Gurmeet Singh, Guru Randhawa, Balli Kassi, Ikwinder Singh, Jay K (Jassi Katyal), and Vee on lyrics by Bunny Johal, Money K, Ravi Raj, Happy Raikoti and Guru Randhawa.

References

External links
 

2019 films
Punjabi-language Indian films
2010s Punjabi-language films
Indian romantic comedy films
2019 romantic comedy films
T-Series (company) films
Films scored by Guru Randhawa